Christ Church Teddington, founded in 1864, is an independent Reformed Protestant Congregational church on Christchurch Avenue in Teddington, in the London Borough of Richmond upon Thames. It is associated with the Evangelical Fellowship of Congregational Churches. Its minister is Rev. Dominic Stockford (who is also Chairman of the Protestant Truth Society).

In 2015 the Victorian church building, dating from 1869, was sold to be converted into six two-bedroom flats, retaining the original stained glass windows. The 1970s community hall next to the old church was refurbished and extended for use in services.

References

External links
 Official website

1864 establishments in England
Churches completed in 1864
Churches in Teddington
Churches in the London Borough of Richmond upon Thames
Congregational churches in London
Evangelical churches in London
Religious organizations established in 1864